The 1998–99 Slovenian Ice Hockey League season was the eighth season of the Slovenian Hockey League. Olimpija defeated Slavija in the league final.

Final
18 March 1999: Olimpija – Slavija : 5–1  
20 March 1999: Slavija – Olimpija : 2–7 (0–3, 0–3, 2–1)
22 March 1999: Olimpija – Slavija : 7–2 (2–1, 5–0, 0–1)

External links
Slovenian league 1998–99

1998–99 in Slovenian ice hockey
Slovenia
Slovenian Ice Hockey League seasons